The 2007 All-Africa Games football – Women's tournament was the 2nd edition of the African Games men's football tournament for women. The football tournament was held in Algiers, Algeria in July 2007 as part of the 2007 All-Africa Games.
Six teams took part. The final was a repeat of the first one four years ago. Nigeria again beat South Africa.

Qualification

Algeria (hosts), Nigeria and Ghana qualified automatically. Cameroon and Mozambique withdrew. Teams that qualified for the tournament were:

Final tournament
All times given as local time (UTC+1)

The top two teams advanced. Ethiopia and Senegal were eliminated.

Group stage

Group A
Group A consisted of Ethiopia, Nigeria and South Africa.

Group B
Group B consisted of Algeria, Ghana and Senegal.

Knockout stage

Semifinals

Third-place match

Final

Final ranking

See also
Football at the 2007 All-Africa Games – Men's tournament

References

External links
2007 All-Africa Games – Women's tournament at rsssf.com
BBC.com - results
Football (Tournoi, Dames) - Le Midi Libre

Tournament